Baskemölla is a locality situated in Simrishamn Municipality, Skåne County, Sweden with 238 inhabitants as of 2005.

Tjörnedala is an exhibition space there with frequent art shows, and a small cafe. There is also a nature trail behind this farm house, leading down to the water. Every Midsummer Day, there is a folk dance celebration on the hill behind the farm house.

References 

Populated places in Skåne County
Populated places in Simrishamn Municipality